In mathematics, a trivial group or zero group is a group consisting of a single element. All such groups are isomorphic, so one often speaks of the trivial group. The single element of the trivial group is the identity element and so it is usually denoted as such:  or  depending on the context. If the group operation is denoted  then it is defined by  

The similarly defined  is also a group since its only element is its own inverse, and is hence the same as the trivial group. 

The trivial group is distinct from the empty set, which has no elements, hence lacks an identity element, and so cannot be a group.

Definitions 

The term, when referred to " has no nontrivial proper subgroups" refers to the only subgroups of  being the trivial group  and the group  itself.

Properties 

The trivial group is cyclic of order ; as such it may be denoted  or  If the group operation is called addition, the trivial group is usually denoted by  If the group operation is called multiplication then 1 can be a notation for the trivial group. Combining these leads to the trivial ring in which the addition and multiplication operations are identical and  

The trivial group serves as the zero object in the category of groups, meaning it is both an initial object and a terminal object.

The trivial group can be made a (bi-)ordered group by equipping it with the trivial non-strict order

See also

References 

 

Finite groups